Payns is a commune in the Aube department in north-central France.

Population

History

Prehistory

Some traces were discovered through an aerial archaeological survey. At a place called La Ruelle, a protohistoric necropolis with square enclosures was photographed, thus testifying to the existence of protohistoric communities.

Roman and Gallo-Roman eras

The Antonine Itinerary, “Itinerarium Antonini Augusti”, dating from the end of the 3rd century, evokes Payns because of the possibility of fording the Seine at this place. The Tabula Peutingeriana (map) also testifies to this, itself a copy of a Roman map dating from the 13th century, on which appear the 53 roads which served the Roman Empire.

Middle Ages 

The oldest evocation of the village of Payns is listed in the 9th century.

The archives of the department of Aube contain some Carolingian documents, in particular a cartulary from the abbey of Saint-Pierre de Montiéramey, founded around 887 by a priest named Arremar, in the middle of the vast Der forest. It mentions the sale by Hildemar to Arrémar of the "villa Pendennagio" which is none other than the village of Payns.

At the beginning of the 12th century, the stronghold of Payns was a vassal of the county of Champagne. This explains why Hugues de Payns accompanied his suzerain, Hugues de Troyes, count of Champagne to Jerusalem in 1104.

Having decided to settle there, Hugues de Payns returned to Jerusalem in 1114.

A mill has been in operation since 1236, it belonged to the priory of Foissy. Ruined by the English during the Hundred Years War, it was rented to the lessee to rebuild it. Jean Le Bray rented it for life for 26 livre a paper mill, two wheat and one hemp in 1476; they were in very poor condition and he had to sell the lease fairly quickly to Philippe Le Mercier and his wife Claude Le Bé. In 1531 it passed into the Largentier family, Nicolas marrying Madeleine Lemercier, daughter of the previous owners. In 1583, after a trial, the priory of Foissy gave up ownership of the mills against an annual rent of 63 livre.

The Templar Knights

Hugues de Payns founded in the Holy Land, the order "Paupere Militie Christi", in modern English the Militia of the Poor Knights of Christ. After the First Crusade, the Council of Troyes fixed the rule of what had become the order "Pauperes commilitones Christi templique Salomonici Hierosalemitanis", or in modern English, the militia of the poor knights of the temple of Solomon, better known today under the order name of the Temple or the Knights Templar.

In 1998, archaeological research carried out on the site of the commandery of Payns revealed coins dated between 1035 and 1240.
The Payns monetary deposit was discovered in September 1998; it is made up of 708 coins from the 12th century and 13th century. Royal coins are strongly represented: 499 deniers of monarchs from Louis VI (1108-1137) to Philip II (1180-1123). Very few local coins: only 7 deniers of the archdiocese of Reims.

See also
Communes of the Aube department
Hugues de Payens

References

Communes of Aube
Aube communes articles needing translation from French Wikipedia